Twin Lakes is a  lake on Bois Blanc, an island in Lake Huron in the U.S. state of Michigan. The lake, which consists of two almost-completely-separated sheets of water virtually bisected by a near-isthmus, is one of the largest lakes in Michigan that is situated entirely inside an island in a larger lake. Twin Lakes itself contains several smaller islands within the body of water.

Twin Lakes is surrounded by wetland. About 75% of the lake's shoreline is owned by the State of Michigan, largely as siltland or lowland brush. For fisheries management purposes, the Michigan Department of Natural Resources deployed gill nets in July 2012 to see which fish were found in the lake. The lake was found to be populated by large quantities of panfish, with the most common species being pumpkinseed sunfish. Brown bullhead and walleye were noted. The lake drains through Sucker Creek into Lake Huron.

See also
 Siskiwit Lake

References

Lakes of Michigan